David Manga (born 3 February 1989) is a Central African footballer who plays for the Central African Republic national team.

Club career
Manga began playing in the Paris Saint-Germain youth academy. In 2007, he played with SC Eisenstandt in Austrian Regional League East.

In 2008, he signed a contract with TSV 1860 Munich and played three seasons for their second team in the German Regionalliga Süd. After 2010 he was a non-used substitute on several occasions at 1860 Munich main team, however he failed to make an appearance.

On 15 August 2011, after passing trial period and finishing medical exams, he signed with Serbian SuperLiga champions FK Partizan. He made his debut on 21 September 2011, in a 2011–12 Serbian Cup match against FK Novi Pazar, as a substitute of Saša Ilić in the 73rd minute. His league debut only happened on 22 October 2011, in the round 9 match against Javor with Manga entering in the 87th minute of the match. On 21 April 2012, he scored his first league goal in a shot after a long run in the 93rd minute of the 25th round match against Smederevo. He was a substitute at that match, when Avram Grant brought him into the game in 81st minute, a move which ended up being decisive as Manga was involved in the action of the first goal and scored the second in the 2–0 victory of his side.

In summer 2012 he joined Israeli Premier League side Hapoel Ramat Gan on a loan deal.

On 9 June 2017, Manga signed a two-year contract with Azerbaijan Premier League side Zira FK, but had his contract cancelled by mutual consent on 15 December 2017.

After returning to France and spending the 2019–20 season with French lower league side FC Franconville, Manga joined Championnat National 3 club Racing Besançon in June 2020.

Manga moved to fifth-tier Oberliga Westfalen side 1. FC Kaan-Marienborn from AS Saint-Ouen-L'Aumône in February 2022.

International career
His debut for the Central African Republic national team was on 10 October 2010 in a match against Algeria for the 2012 Africa Cup of Nations qualification.

Personal life
Born in Paris, France, David Manga's father was born in the Central African Republic and his mother is from Cameroon.

Career statistics

Honours
Partizan
 Serbian SuperLiga: 2011–12

Hapoel Ramat Gan
 Israel State Cup: 2013

Hapoel Ironi Kiryat Shmona
 Israel State Cup: 2014

References

External links

 
 

1989 births
Living people
Citizens of the Central African Republic through descent
Central African Republic people of Cameroonian descent
French sportspeople of Central African Republic descent
French sportspeople of Cameroonian descent
Central African Republic footballers
French footballers
Footballers from Paris
Association football midfielders
Central African Republic international footballers
Austrian Regionalliga players
Regionalliga players
Serbian SuperLiga players
Israeli Premier League players
First Professional Football League (Bulgaria) players
Azerbaijan Premier League players
Super League Greece players
SC Eisenstadt players
TSV 1860 Munich II players
TSV 1860 Munich players
FK Partizan players
Hapoel Ramat Gan F.C. players
Hapoel Ironi Kiryat Shmona F.C. players
Hapoel Ashkelon F.C. players
ASA 2013 Târgu Mureș players
PFC Beroe Stara Zagora players
Zira FK players
Levadiakos F.C. players
1. FC Kaan-Marienborn players
Central African Republic expatriate footballers
French expatriate footballers
Central African Republic expatriate sportspeople in Austria
French expatriate sportspeople in Austria
Expatriate footballers in Austria
Central African Republic expatriate sportspeople in Germany
French expatriate sportspeople in Germany
Expatriate footballers in Germany
Central African Republic expatriate sportspeople in Serbia
French expatriate sportspeople in Serbia
Expatriate footballers in Serbia
Central African Republic expatriate sportspeople in Israel
French expatriate sportspeople in Israel
Expatriate footballers in Israel
Central African Republic expatriate sportspeople in Romania
French expatriate sportspeople in Romania
Expatriate footballers in Romania
Central African Republic expatriate sportspeople in Bulgaria
French expatriate sportspeople in Bulgaria
Expatriate footballers in Bulgaria
Central African Republic expatriate sportspeople in Azerbaijan
Expatriate footballers in Azerbaijan
French expatriate sportspeople in Azerbaijan
Central African Republic expatriate sportspeople in Greece
French expatriate sportspeople in Greece
Expatriate footballers in Greece